Sébastien Dhavernas (born 19 January 1950) is a Canadian actor.

Dhavernas was born in Montreal, Quebec. He is the husband of actress Michèle Deslauriers and the father of actress Caroline Dhavernas and voice actress Gabrielle Dhavernas. He completed his classical studies at Collège Stanislas, did a year in Sociology at McGill University, and subsequently attended the Conservatoire d'art dramatique de Montréal.

In addition to acting, Dhavernas has done French-language voice dubbing, attaining some fame as the voice of Roger Rabbit in the French-language version of the film Who Framed Roger Rabbit. In 1989, he urged the government of Canada to pass legislation requiring that the majority of French-dubbed television programs in Quebec actually be dubbed in the province, rather than in France. He was later described as being responsible for overseeing dubbing issues in Quebec's Union des artistes. Dhavernas has also acted in theatre, including in a Quebec production of Les Misérables, and has served as president of the Canadian Artists and Producers Professional Relations Tribunal (CAPPRT).

Dhavernas ran for the Liberal Party of Canada in the Montreal riding of Outremont in the 2008 federal election, campaigning against cuts to arts funding that had been introduced by the Conservative government of Stephen Harper. He made his decision to run only days before the election. Ultimately, he finished second against New Democratic Party incumbent and future party leader Thomas Mulcair. Following the election, Dhavernas was appointed to a Liberal Party political commission headed by Serge Joyal. Dhavernas intended to run for the Liberal nomination in Outremont again in the buildup to the 2011 election, but he was advised that the seat would be reserved for a star candidate.

He ran for Montreal city council in the 2013 municipal election as a candidate of Équipe Denis Coderre pour Montréal in Verdun division of Desmarchais-Crawford and
narrowly lost to Sterling Downey of Projet Montréal.

Dhavernas has written for HuffPosts French language Quebec site.

Selected filmography
 René Lévesque (2008) .... Robert Bourassa
 Trudeau II: Maverick in the Making (2005) (TV) .... Parisian Publisher
 Maurice Richard: Histoire d'un Canadien (1999) .... Voix à la radio
 Réseaux (1998–1999) ... J. C. Michaud
 Watatatow (1991–2005) ... André Dubuc
 The Gunrunner (1984) .... Fred Samuel
 Le temps d'une paix (1980–1986) .... Raoul Savary
 Le pont (1976) .... Gilles
 Y'a pas de problème (1975–1977) .... Michelle Duquette

Electoral record

References

External links 
 

1950 births
Canadian actor-politicians
Collège Stanislas de Paris alumni
Canadian male film actors
Canadian male television actors
French Quebecers
Candidates in the 2008 Canadian federal election
Living people
Male actors from Montreal
Politicians from Montreal
Quebec candidates for Member of Parliament
Liberal Party of Canada candidates for the Canadian House of Commons